Simon Middleton  (born 2 February 1966) is an English former rugby union and professional rugby league footballer who played in the 1980s and 1990s and the current head coach of the England Women's rugby union team.

Playing career
Middleton is a former cross-code wing/full back having played rugby league for Castleford (Heritage № 693) as well as rugby union for a number of clubs including Leeds Tykes, where he took up a coaching role following his retirement from playing.

Coaching career 
He spent 11 years at Leeds holding various coaching roles including defence, skills and eventually assistant coach, and helped them to the Premiership twice as well as achieve Heineken Cup qualification for the first time in their history. He joined the RFU in 2014 and led the England Women Sevens on the World Series, as well as taking a role as assistant coach for the 2014 Rugby World Cup in France where England were crowned champions. In 2015, he became Red Roses head coach initially in a joint role with sevens. He was appointed head coach of Team GB Women Sevens where the team finished fourth at the Rio 2016 Summer Olympics, the sport’s Olympic debut, before focusing fully on XVs on his return. Since taking the role, Middleton has guided England to three Six Nations Grand Slams in 2017, 2019 and 2020, the 2021 Six Nations title and helped the team reach a fifth straight World Cup final in 2017 when they lost 41-32.

Middleton was appointed Member of the Order of the British Empire (MBE) in the 2021 Birthday Honours for services to rugby football.

Personal life 
Middleton is married to Janet. They have two children, Joel and Cara.

References

External links
Statistics at rugbyleagueproject.org
(archived by web.archive.org) Profile at thecastlefordtigers.co.uk

1966 births
Living people
British Olympic coaches
Castleford Tigers players
Coaches of international rugby sevens teams
English rugby league players
English rugby union players
English rugby union coaches
Members of the Order of the British Empire
Rugby league players from Wakefield
Rugby league wingers
Rugby union players from Wakefield